The Yellow Arrow is the allegorical short story by Victor Pelevin written in 1993. It was published in different collections of works of the author.

Plot
The hero of the story is Andrei, a passenger on the nonstop express train, tormented by the question of the meaning of traffic. The impetus to the awakening of his consciousness is a meeting with a man named Khan, who showed him the secret inscriptions in the secluded areas of the train. An attempt to find a new point of observation (the so-called "ritual death" - an exit to the roof of the train) does not reveal the truth he is seeking: there are only a few loners with the faces of sleepwalkers continuing their aimless movement on top of the same express train. But one day Andrei and Han see a "strange man with a straw hat over his shoulders," pushing off the roof, jumping over the bridge railing while the train is moving, landing in the river and floating to the shore. The path is indicated, there is a way out of the ordinary space, and the main character Andrei commits an act: he leaves the carriage, chooses the freedom of the world, unfamiliar, disturbing, and the glittering yellow windows of the train flies past to the destroyed bridge.

The train moves almost forever, people on it are born and die, doing business and going bankrupt, falling in love and starting families. But this movement is mechanistic and automatic, like the movement of robots, they do not notice it, just as they do not notice the rhythm of the heart, the movement of the blood in the veins, or breathing. The juxtaposition of Russian realities with Eastern philosophy provides a new semantic twist: Buddhism, in particular, helps us understand the meaning of Russian reality. 

The story uses many allegories, many times the railroad theme is used in every object of this world. The train symbolizes life, the destroyed bridge symbolizes death, and the pounding of the wheels symbolizes the passage of time. There are a number of references to the Bible. There is also an allusion to Franz Kafka's parable "The Railway Passengers".

The author uses allegories in the story, as the railway theme is displayed in all objects of this world.

"I am closest of all to happiness—although I won't attempt to define just what it is—when I turn away from the window and am aware, with the edge of my consciousness, that a moment ago I was not here, there was simply the world outside the window, and something beautiful and incomprehensible, something which there is absolutely no need to 'comprehend,' existed for a few seconds instead of the usual swarm of thoughts, of which one, like a locomotive, pulls all the others after it, absorbs them all and calls itself 'I'."

See also
 Le Transperceneige
 Snowpiercer
 Chapayev and Void

External links
 http://www.publishersweekly.com/978-0-8112-1324-0

References

Fiction about rail transport
Novels by Victor Pelevin
Magic realism
Postmodern literature
1993 short stories
Counterculture of the 1990s